Eudonia commortalis is a moth in the family Crambidae. It was described by Harrison Gray Dyar Jr. in 1921. It is found in North America, where it has been recorded from Alaska to British Columbia, Washington and California.

Adults have been recorded on wing from April to September.

References

Moths described in 1921
Eudonia